Say You Love Me is the second studio album by American singer Jennifer Holliday released on vinyl and cassette. It was released by Geffen Records. In 1985, two singles were released from the album. The singles were "Hard Time for Lovers" and "No Frills Love". Michael Jackson co-wrote and produced the album's opener "You're The One." The album charted at #110 on the Billboard 200 and #34 at the Top R&B/Hip-Hop Albums.

Track listing

 "You're The One" (Michael Jackson, Alan "Buz" Kohan)
 "What Kind of Love Is This" (John Duarte, Mark Paul)
 "No Frills Love" (Arthur Baker, Gary Henry, Tina B)
 "Hard Times for Lovers" (Lotti Golden, Richard Scher, Bobby Coleman)
 "Say You Love Me" (D. J. Rogers)
 "I Rest My Case" (Carl Sturken, Evan Rogers)
 "Dreams Never Die" (John Duarte, Mark Paul)
 "Just a Matter of Time" (V. Jeffrey Smith)
 "He's a Pretender" (Gary Goetzman, Mike Piccirillo)
  "Come Sunday" (Duke Ellington)

References
 

1985 albums
Jennifer Holliday albums
Albums produced by Tommy LiPuma
Albums produced by Arthur Baker (musician)
Albums produced by Michael Jackson
Albums produced by Carl Sturken and Evan Rogers
Geffen Records albums